Stanford v. Kentucky, 492 U.S. 361 (1989), was a United States Supreme Court case that sanctioned the imposition of the death penalty on offenders who were at least 16 years of age at the time of the crime.  This decision came one year after Thompson v. Oklahoma, in which the Court had held that a 15-year-old offender could not be executed because to do so would constitute cruel and unusual punishment. In 2003, the Governor of Kentucky Paul E. Patton commuted the death sentence of Kevin Stanford, an action followed by the Supreme Court two years later in Roper v. Simmons overruling Stanford and holding that all juvenile offenders are exempt from the death penalty.

Background
The case involved the shooting death of 20-year-old Barbel Poore in Jefferson County, Kentucky. Kevin Stanford committed the murder on January 7, 1981, when he was approximately 17 years and 4 months of age. Stanford and his accomplice repeatedly raped and sodomized Poore during and after their commission of a robbery at a gas station where she worked as an attendant. They then drove her to a secluded area near the station, where Stanford shot her pointblank in the face and then in the back of her head. The proceeds from the robbery were roughly 300 cartons of cigarettes, two gallons of fuel, and a small amount of cash.

After Stanford's arrest, a Kentucky juvenile court conducted hearings to determine whether he should be transferred for trial as an adult, and, stressing the seriousness of his offenses and his long history of past delinquency, found that certification for trial as an adult to be in the best interest of Stanford and the community.

Stanford was convicted of murder, first-degree sodomy, first-degree robbery, and receiving stolen property, and was sentenced to death and 45 years in prison. The Kentucky Supreme Court affirmed the death sentence, rejecting Stanford's "deman[d] that he has a constitutional right to treatment". Finding that the record clearly demonstrated that "there was no program or treatment appropriate for the appellant in the juvenile justice system", the court held that the juvenile court did not err in certifying Stanford for trial as an adult. The court also stated that Stanford's "age and the possibility that he might be rehabilitated were mitigating factors appropriately left to the consideration of the jury that tried him".

Oral arguments
Oral arguments were heard 27 March 1989. Prior to the hearing, briefs of amici curiae pushing for reversal were filed by the American Baptist Churches, the Child Welfare League of America, and the West Virginia Council of Churches. Briefs supporting the affirmation of the capital sentence were filed by the Attorney General of Kentucky and a number of attorneys general from other states.

In both cases, briefs of amici curiae were put forth by the American Bar Association, the American Society for Adolescent Psychiatry, the International Human Rights Group, and Amnesty International.

Arguments in the defense of petitioners Stanford and Wilkins (see below) were that the application of capital punishment upon defendants who were minors at the time of the offense was unconstitutional because it violated the prohibition of "cruel and unusual punishment" under the Eighth Amendment to the United States Constitution.

Opinion
In both Stanford v. Kentucky, and the parallel case Wilkins v. Missouri, the Supreme Court affirmed the capital punishments handed down in lower courts. Writing for the majority, Justice Antonin Scalia wrote that neither Stanford or Wilkins asserted that the punishment was cruel or unusual at the time the Bill of Rights was adopted (common law at the time set the incapacity to commit a felony at age 14), and so both petitioners were left to argue that capital punishment for minors older than 14, was contrary to "the evolving standards of decency". This expanse in the review of the Eighth Amendment was not granted in this decision, and Scalia went on to cite precedent limits set in Gregg v. Georgia (1976).

We discern neither a historical nor a modern societal consensus forbidding the imposition of capital punishment on any person who murders at 16 or 17 years of age. Accordingly, we conclude that such punishment does not offend the Eighth Amendment's prohibition against cruel and unusual punishment. ... and to mean that as the dissent means it, i.e., that it is for us to judge, not on the basis of what we perceive the Eighth Amendment originally prohibited, or on the basis of what we perceive the society through its democratic processes now overwhelmingly disapproves, but on the basis of what we think "proportionate" and "measurably contributory to acceptable goals of punishment" – to say and mean that, is to replace judges of the law with a committee of philosopher-kings.

Justice Sandra Day O'Connor, although agreeing that no national consensus forbade the imposition of capital punishment on 16- or 17-year-old murderers, concluded that the court has a constitutional obligation to conduct proportionality analysis, (citing Penry v. Lynaugh) and should consider age-based statutory classifications that are relevant to that analysis. Although the Court's decision in Stanford was intended to reflect contemporary society's values regarding the execution of sixteen and seventeen-year-old criminal offenders, it failed to do so because the Justices made their decision based on objective data interpreted in  a subjective manner. The Court in Stanford thus reflected its own interpretation of the Eighth Amendment values far more than it reflected the values of contemporary American society. Justice O'Connor's opinion was not consistent with her prior holding in Thompson where she considered the laws of those states that categorically prohibited capital punishment as "objective indicia" of contemporary society's views. At the very least, it appears that Justice O'Connor's rejection of those same data in the instant case was a subjective (and inconsistent) decision, and therefore, in contravention of the ruling in Coker (1977) which held that "Eighth Amendment judgments should not be, or appear to be, merely the subjective views of individual Justices; judgment should be informed by objective factors to the maximum possible extent." The significance of this discrepancy is enormous; if Justice O'Connor would have included those fourteen states which prohibited capital punishment altogether, it is highly probable that she would have joined with the dissent, and therefore, in effect, reversed the decision of the Court.  

Justice Brennan filed a dissenting opinion, in which he was joined by Justices Marshall, Blackmun, and Stevens.

See also
 Capital punishment for juveniles in the United States
 List of United States Supreme Court cases, volume 492
 List of United States Supreme Court cases
 Lists of United States Supreme Court cases by volume
 List of United States Supreme Court cases by the Rehnquist Court

References

External links
 

Cruel and Unusual Punishment Clause and death penalty case law
United States Supreme Court cases
Capital punishment in Kentucky
Capital punishment in Missouri
Legal history of Kentucky
1989 in United States case law
1989 in Kentucky
Capital punishment for juveniles
Overruled United States Supreme Court decisions
Jefferson County, Kentucky
History of Louisville, Kentucky
United States Supreme Court cases of the Rehnquist Court